USNS Potomac has been the name of more than one U.S. Navy ship:

 , a Maumee-class oiler, in service from 1957 until destroyed in a fire in 1961
 , an oiler in service from 1976 to 1983.

See also
 

United States Navy ship names